A chemical messenger is any compound that serves to transmit a message, and may refer to:

Hormone, long range chemical messenger
Neurotransmitter, communicates to adjacent cells
Neuropeptide, a protein sequence which acts as a hormone or neurotransmitter. The blood or other body fluids transport neuropeptides to non adjacent target cells, where neuropeptides exert their effect.
Pheromone, a chemical factor that triggers a social response in members of the same species

See also
 Cell signaling